George Owen may refer to:
George Owen (physician) (1499–1558), royal physician
George Owen of Henllys (1552–1613), Welsh antiquarian, author, and naturalist
George Owen (herald) (died 1665), Welsh officer of arms, son of George Owen of Henllys 
George Washington Owen (1796–1837), U. S. Representative from Alabama
George Owen (ice hockey) (1901–1986), ice hockey defenseman
George Owen (footballer) (1865–1922), Welsh footballer
George Owen (cyclist) (1893–?), British cyclist
George Vale Owen (1869–1931), Church of England clergyman and spiritualist

See also
George Owens (disambiguation)